General Sir Daniel Lysons  (1 August 1816 – 29 January 1898) was a British Army general who achieved high office in the 1870s.

Military career
The son of Daniel Lysons the topographer, he was educated at Shrewsbury School. He was commissioned into the 1st Regiment of Foot in 1834. He was shipwrecked on The Premier in the Gulf of Saint Lawrence in 1840 and sought help to rescue many of his comrades. He transferred to the 23rd (Welsh) Fusiliers in 1844.

Lysons fought at the Battle of Alma in September 1854 and took command of the 2nd Brigade of the Light Division in October 1855 during the Crimean War.

In 1869 Lysons became General Officer Commanding for Aldershot District and in 1872 he became GOC for Northern District. In 1876 he was made Quartermaster-General to the Forces. Then from 1880 to 1883 he commanded the Aldershot Division. He retired in 1883.

Lysons was appointed Constable of the Tower in 1890.

Family
In 1856 he married Harriet Sophia Bridges and together they went on to have four daughters. In 1865 he married Anna Sophia Biscoe Tritton.

References

Sources

 

|-
 

|-
 

|-

 

1816 births
1898 deaths
British Army generals
Knights Grand Cross of the Order of the Bath
People educated at Shrewsbury School
Royal Scots officers
Royal Welch Fusiliers officers
British Army personnel of the Crimean War
Constables of the Tower of London